Eva Paulusová-Benešová (19 February 1937 – 18 October 2017) was a Czech cross-country skier. She competed at the 1956 Winter Olympics and the 1964 Winter Olympics.

Cross-country skiing results

Olympic Games

World Championships

References

External links
 

1937 births
2017 deaths
Czech female cross-country skiers
Olympic cross-country skiers of Czechoslovakia
Cross-country skiers at the 1956 Winter Olympics
Cross-country skiers at the 1964 Winter Olympics
People from Jilemnice
Sportspeople from the Liberec Region